Mecistogaster buckleyi is a species of damselfly in the family Pseudostigmatidae. It is found in South America.

The IUCN conservation status of Mecistogaster buckleyi is "LC", least concern, with no immediate threat to the species' survival. The IUCN status was reviewed in 2009.

References

Further reading

 

Pseudostigmatidae
Articles created by Qbugbot
Insects described in 1881
Taxobox binomials not recognized by IUCN